This is a list of medical schools located in Japan.

Private medical colleges
Aichi Medical University ja
Dokkyo University School of Medicine ja
Fukuoka University ja
Fujita Health University ja
Hyogo College of Medicine ja
Iwate Medical University ja
Jichi Medical School ja
Jikei University School of Medicine ja
Juntendo University ja
Kawasaki Medical School ja
Kanazawa Medical University ja
Kansai Medical University ja
Kitasato University ja
Kyorin University ja
Kinki University ja
Kurume University ja
Keio University ja
Nihon University ja
Nippon Medical School ja
Osaka Medical College ja
Saitama Medical School ja
Showa University ja
St. Marianna University School of Medicine ja
Teikyo University ja
Toho University ja
Tokai University ja
Tokyo Medical University ja
Tokyo Women's Medical University ja
University of Occupational and Environmental Health ja

Public colleges
Akita University ja
Asahikawa Medical University ja
Ehime University ja
Oita University ja
Osaka University ja
Okayama University ja
Kagawa University ja
Kagoshima University ja
Kanazawa University ja
Gifu University ja
Kyushu University ja
Kyoto University ja
Kumamoto University ja
Gunma University ja
Kochi University ja
Kobe University ja
Saga University ja
Shiga University of Medical Science ja
Shimane University ja
Shinshu University ja
National Defense Medical College ja
Chiba University ja
University of Tsukuba ja
University of Tokyo ja
Tokyo Medical and Dental University ja
Tohoku University ja
University of Tokushima ja
Tottori University ja
University of Toyama ja
Nagasaki University ja
Nagoya University ja
Niigata University ja
Hamamatsu University School of Medicine ja
Hirosaki University ja
Hiroshima University ja
Fukui University ja
Hokkaido University ja
Mie University ja
University of Miyazaki ja
Yamagata University ja
Yamaguchi University ja
University of Yamanashi ja
University of the Ryukyus ja
Sapporo Medical University ja
Yokohama City University ja
Nagoya City University ja
Kyoto Prefectural University of Medicine ja
Nara Medical University ja
Fukushima Medical University ja
Osaka City University ja
Wakayama Medical University ja

References

See also
Medical school
List of medical schools

Medical schools
Japan